Leclère is a French surname. Notable people with the surname include:

Achille-François-René Leclère (1785–1853), French architect
Adhémar Leclère (1853–1917), French diplomat and politician
Alexandra Leclère, French film director
Ernest Leclère (1865–1938), Luxembourgian politician
Michel Leclère (born 1946), French racing driver

French-language surnames